Luxborough is a small village and civil parish located some  south of Dunster, lying amongst the Brendon Hills and the Exmoor National Park in Somerset, England. It is divided into the hamlets of Churchtown, Kingsbridge and Pooltown, which lie within a mile of each other. Luxborough, 'Lolochesberie' in the Domesday Book, means 'stronghold or hill of a man called Lulluc'.

Administratively, the civil parish falls within the Somerset West and Taunton local government district and the Somerset shire county, with administrative tasks shared between county, district and parish councils. In 2011, the population of the parish was 237.

History

Luxborough was part of the hundred of Carhampton.

About 100 years ago, people used to mine iron ore around Luxborough. It was taken by train down the West Somerset Mineral Railway's incline to Watchet, beside the Bristol Channel and shipped to Newport. There are the remains of several buildings, including stations, such as Luxborough Road railway station.

Luxborough had a new village hall put in a few years ago, and because there is no mobile phone signal in the village, it still has its old telephone box.

The village school was closed in 1971 as the result of the three-tier education system introduced in West Somerset.  Village children now attend Dunster School.  In the 19th century the school was reported to have 200 pupils from the village and the iron mines in the Brendon Hills.

Governance

The parish council has responsibility for local issues, including setting an annual precept (local rate) to cover the council’s operating costs and producing annual accounts for public scrutiny. The parish council evaluates local planning applications and works with the local police, district council officers, and neighbourhood watch groups on matters of crime, security, and traffic. The parish council's role also includes initiating projects for the maintenance and repair of parish facilities, as well as consulting with the district council on the maintenance, repair, and improvement of highways, drainage, footpaths, public transport, and street cleaning. Conservation matters (including trees and listed buildings) and environmental issues are also the responsibility of the council.

The village falls within the non-metropolitan district of Somerset West and Taunton, which was established on 1 April 2019. It was previously in the district of West Somerset, which was formed on 1 April 1974 under the Local Government Act 1972, and part of Williton Rural District before that. The district council is responsible for local planning and building control, local roads, council housing, environmental health, markets and fairs, refuse collection and recycling, cemeteries and crematoria, leisure services, parks, and tourism.

Somerset County Council is responsible for running the largest and most expensive local services such as education, social services, libraries, main roads, public transport, policing and  fire services, trading standards, waste disposal and strategic planning.

It is also part of the Bridgwater and West Somerset county constituency represented in the House of Commons of the Parliament of the United Kingdom. It elects one Member of Parliament (MP) by the first past the post system of election.

Geography

The Washford River rises close to the village and flows through the Kingsbridge valley, and Pooltown takes its name from the large number of pools on the river there. The Washford River is joined by one of its tributaries, which flows in the Churchtown valley, starting in the wooded combe called Throat.

The village is both on the route of the Coleridge Way and Samaritans Way South West and is located within the Exmoor National Park.

Religious sites

The Church of St Mary dates from  Norman times, but has had the tower added on and it had an extension put on in the 19th century. It is a Grade II listed building A new window was added in 2002.

References

Villages in West Somerset
Civil parishes in Somerset